Dichapetalum cymosum, commonly known as gifblaar from Afrikaans, or occasionally by its English translation, poison leaf, is a small prostrate shrub occurring in northern parts of Southern Africa in the family  Dichapetalaceae. It is notable as a common cause of lethal cattle poisoning in this region and is considered one of the 'big 6' toxic plants of cattle in South Africa. A 1996 estimate of plant poisonings in South Africa attributes 8% of cattle mortality caused by poisonous plants to it. The majority (70%) of fatal cases are in Limpopo province, with 10% each in North West, Mpumalanga, and Gauteng. Fluoroacetate, the poison used to synthetically produce Compound 1080 used extensively in New Zealand, occurs in all parts of the plant and is responsible for the toxic effects shown.

Toxic effects include vomiting, seizures, and an irregular heartbeat, and death can occur in as little as a few hours. This poison is known as “the poison that keeps on killing” because the toxin stays in the body after the animal dies, so if a predator eats the animal, the predator gets poisoned, and so on up the food chain. It can easily kill small mammals such as rats, earning it the name "ratbane"; it was banned for commercial use in the United States in 1972 by the Environmental Protection Agency

Dichapetalum cymosum was first recognised as toxic by the early Voortrekkers entering the Transvaal, who were probably alerted to its lethality by natives living in the region.

Description
Above ground, the plant is seen as a clump of small, woody shrubs about 15 cm (6 in) high. Such a clump is typically a single plant, as gifblaar has a huge underground root system - likened to an underground tree - and sends numerous shoots above ground in favourable conditions. The most obvious above ground parts are the leaves - simple, alternate with initially fine hairs later becoming glabrous. The leaves are bright green in colour on both sides. The secondary veins form loops and do not reach the margin. The flowers are small and white, and occur as dense clumps in the early spring. Fruit formation is rare; the fruits are orange and leathery, are not poisonous and known to be consumed by the San people.

Identification of gifblaar in the field is important in prevention of toxicity and also in assigning gifblaar as the cause of toxicity in an outbreak. It is a small, low-growing, nondescript shrub and thus easily confused with other species. There are four principal "confusers" in its habitat. These are Ochna pulchra (lekkerbreek) saplings, Parinari capensis (grysappel), Pygmaeothamnus spp. (goorappels) and the various gousiektebossies (various genera and species of the family Rubiaceae, such as Vangueria). The first three of these are non-toxic, but gousiektebossies are also toxic and another of the 'big 6' cattle poisons.

Of the similar species, gousiektebossies and goorappel have opposite, not alternate, leaves. Goorappel leaves also have a characteristic bulge terminally, though only when mature. Grysappel and Ochna pulchra have alternate leaves, but grysappel has pale grey undersides to its leaves (its name means grey apple). O. pulchra leaves have secondary veins that are not looped and reach the margin, and the margin itself is dentate not smooth.

Distribution and habitat
Gifblaar occurs in dry, sandy areas in acidic soils, as well as the northern slopes of rocky hills in the southern parts of the African savannah biome. In South Africa, the distribution is within the so-called 'gifblaar triangle', the points of which are Mmabatho; Middelburg, Mpumalanga; and Musina. The traditional southern border of distribution is the Magaliesberg mountains. It also occurs in an isolated region in the far north of KwaZulu-Natal. Gifblaar is also found in Namibia, Zimbabwe, Botswana as well as southern Angola. Within its habitat certain indicator species are used to identify veld which potentially harbours gifblaar - this veld is called 'gifveld' by farmers of the region. These are the trees Burkea africana, Terminalia sericea, and Ochna pulchra, and also the shrub Parinari capensis. The latter two species can easily be mistaken for gifblaar.

Toxicity and biochemistry

The toxic compound isolated as the cause of gifblaar poisoning is fluoroacetate, which was first isolated by Marais in 1944. The  of this compound is 0.5 mg/kg which translates to about 200 g of dry plant material to kill a 500 kg cow. The compound itself is not toxic but undergoes lethal synthesis in the body while reacting with coenzyme A, yielding fluoroacetyl-Coenzyme A. This compound reacts with oxaloacetate to form fluorocitrate, which is toxic, being an alternate substrate for aconitase (normal substrate citrate). It binds to the aconitase but cannot be released, irreversibly binding the aconitase causing disruption to the Krebs cycle, leading to a severe inhibition of cellular respiration. Furthermore, fluorocitrate stops citrate from crossing from the cytoplasm into the mitochondrion, where it is needed. In the cytoplasm it becomes degraded.

Pathology
In cattle, death by acute cardiac arrest is seen following drinking or some kind of exertion. Affected animals will show dyspnoea and arrhythmias before this. There may occasionally be neurological signs such as trembling, twitching and convulsions. Death occurs 4 to 24 hours after ingestion. In rare cases, an animal will survive the initial period only to drop dead months later of heart failure - so-called chronic gifblaar poisoning. On post-mortem, leaves may be found in the rumen, cyanosis may be seen, as well as signs of heart failure - congestion, haemorrhage, and myocardial necrosis (on histopathology). Diagnosis is based on these as well as the presence of gifblaar in the camp, particularly if signs of consumption are seen. Tests can be done for monofluoroacetate in rumen fluid, kidneys and liver.

Treatment

Treatment often consists of helping animals to remain calm and rested. Animals are usually removed from the infected camp, but without exciting them. It is thought that withholding water for 48 hours can improve prognosis. There are no confirmed therapeutic measures that have been developed for the prevention or treatment of gifblaar poisoning. Removing all known plants from pastures may reduce risk of exposure.

Pattern of toxicity
Cattle are mostly affected, with sheep, goats and game rarely being poisoned. The compound is equally poisonous to these species; an explanation is that the bulk grazing style of cattle, which is by nature less selective, lends itself to the ingestion of the plant. Young sprouts have more monofluoroacetate, but all parts are lethal. The plant sprouts in late winter, before the spring rains, the cue for most plants - including grasses - to shoot. This makes it the predominant greenery during that period. Cases of poisoning are most frequent at this time. Later in the season, gifblaar poisoning is far less common; presumably enough other grazing occurs that gifblaar is not eaten. Autumn (late season) poisonings also occur. This is associated with heavy grazing, leading to denudation of preferred species, and gifblaar is again the predominant herbage within the camp. Poisoning of carnivores, including dogs, has been reported after consumption of ruminal contents of poisoned animals.

Management
Mechanical methods of removal have proven to be ineffective because of the plant's extensive root system.
From the above it is clear that gifblaar-infested camps are not ungrazeable per se. Nevertheless, caution should be taken and animals should only be grazed later in the season, and the camps should not be overutilised.

Medical use
The fluoroacetate found in the plant may be used as a precursor to other organofluorides. There is preliminary evidence for some of these compounds in HIV anti-infective therapy.

References

Further reading
Vahrmeijer, J. (1981) Gifplante van Suider-Afrika wat veeverliese veroorsaak. Kaapstad: Tafelberg. 
Kellerman, Coetzer, Naudé, and Botha (2005) Plant poisonings and mycotoxicoses of Livestock in South Africa. Cape Town: Oxford University Press. 
van Wyk, van Heerden, and van Oudtshoorn (2002) Poisonous Plants of South Africa. Pretoria: Briza Publications. 
Fiona Upora Ndjupaa feed

cymosum
Geoxyles
Flora of South Africa
Flora of Namibia
Flora of Zimbabwe
Flora of Botswana
Shrubs
Poisonous plants